O 21, laid down K XXI was an  of the Royal Netherlands Navy that saw service during World War II. During the war she sank several ships, among them the German submarine U-95.

Ship history
The submarine was laid down on 20 November 1937 as K XXI at the Koninklijke Maatschappij De Schelde, Vlissingen During construction she was renamed O 21, and was finally launched on 21 October 1939. Following the German invasion of 10 May 1940, the O 21 was hastily commissioned, still incomplete, and sailed for England on 12 May together with her sister  and the tugboat B.V. 37, to be finally completed at the Navy yard in Rosyth.

During the war she operated around England, the Mediterranean Sea, Colombo in the Indian Ocean and Fremantle off the west coast of Australia. She survived the war and was decommissioned on 2 November 1957 and sold for scrap the following year.

Summary of raiding history
Ships sunk and damaged by O 21.

References

1939 ships
Ships built in Vlissingen
World War II submarines of the Netherlands
O 21-class submarines
Submarines built by Koninklijke Maatschappij De Schelde